Harry Leroy Compton  (March 9, 1882 – July 4, 1974) was a  Major League Baseball pitcher. He played for the Cincinnati Reds in 1911. He later managed the Dayton Veterans in 1915.

External links

1882 births
1974 deaths
Cincinnati Reds players
Major League Baseball pitchers
Baseball players from Ohio
Minor league baseball managers
Lancaster Lanks players
Youngstown Champs players
Little Rock Travelers players
Wheeling Stogies players
Dayton Veterans players
Muskegon Reds players
Grand Rapids Black Sox players